Arjan Stroetinga (born 26 June 1981) is a Dutch former professional speed skater.

He won the silver medal in the mass start event at the 2021 World Single Distances Speed Skating Championships, after gold in 2015. He became seven times Dutch national marathon champion. He retired at the end of the 2020-21 speed skating season.

References

External links

1981 births
Living people
Dutch male speed skaters
World Single Distances Speed Skating Championships medalists
Sportspeople from Friesland
People from Ooststellingwerf
21st-century Dutch people
20th-century Dutch people